Kauai, anglicized as Kauai (  or  ), is geologically the second-oldest of the main Hawaiian Islands (after Niʻihau). With an area of 562.3 square miles (1,456.4 km2), it is the fourth-largest of the islands and the 21st-largest island in the United States. Nicknamed the Garden Isle, Kauai lies 73 miles (117 km) across the Kauai Channel, northwest of Oahu. It is the site of Waimea Canyon State Park and the Na Pali Coast State Park.

The United States Census Bureau defines Kauai as census tracts 401 through 409 of Kauai County, Hawaii, which comprises all of the county except the islands of Kaʻula, Lehua and Niihau. The 2020 United States census population of the island was 73,298. The most populous town is Kapaa.

Etymology and language
Hawaiian narrative derives the name's origin from the legend of Hawaiiloa, the Polynesian navigator credited with discovering the Hawaiian Islands. The story relates that he named the island of Kauai after a favorite son; a possible translation of Kauai is "place around the neck", describing how a father would carry his child. Another possible translation is "food season".

Kauai was known for its distinct dialect of the Hawaiian language, which still survives on Niihau. While the standard language today is based on the dialect of Hawaii island, which has no  sound, the Kauai dialect had this sound. This difference applies to all words with these sounds, so the native name for Kauai was pronounced "Tauai", and Kapaa was pronounced "Tapaa".

History
Polynesian inhabitants settled on the island hundreds of years before Europeans arrived, as shown by excavations dating to as early as 200 A.D. to 600 A.D. These first inhabitants, originally from the Marquesas Islands, lived undisturbed for around five centuries until a second wave of seafarers arrived by sea-canoe from Tahiti. Many Hawaiian traditions and belief structures are rooted in the religion and practices that arrived with these Tahitians.

In 1778, Captain James Cook arrived at Waimea Bay, the first European known to have reached the Hawaiian islands. He named the archipelago the "Sandwich Isles" after his patron, the 6th Earl of Sandwich, George Montagu.

During the reign of King Kamehameha, Kauai and Niihau were the last Hawaiian Islands to join his Kingdom of Hawaii. Their ruler, Kaumualii, resisted Kamehameha for years. Kamehameha twice prepared a huge armada of ships and canoes to take the islands by force, and twice failed, once because of a storm, and once because of an epidemic. But in the face of the threat of a further invasion, Kaumualii decided to join the kingdom without bloodshed, and became Kamehameha's vassal in 1810. He ceded the island to the Kingdom of Hawaii upon his death in 1824.

Schäffer affair

In 1815, a ship from the Russian-American Company was wrecked on the island. In 1816, Kaumualiʻi signed an agreement to allow the Russians to build Fort Elizabeth, in an attempt to gain support from the Russians against Kamehameha I. Construction began during 1817, but in July of that year, under mounting resistance of Native Hawaiians and American traders, the Russians were expelled. The settlement on Kauaʻi was an instance of a Pacific outpost of the Russian Empire.

Old Sugar Mill of Koloa

In 1835, Old Koloa Town opened a sugar mill. From 1906 to 1934 the office of County Clerk was held by John Mahiʻai Kāneakua, who had been active in attempts to restore Queen Liliuokalani to the throne after the U.S. takeover of Hawaii in 1893.

Valdemar Knudsen
Valdemar Emil Knudsen was a Norwegian plantation pioneer who arrived on Kauai in 1857. Knudsen, or "Kanuka", originally arrived in Koloa, where he managed Grove Farm, but later sought a warmer land and purchased the leases to Mana and Kekaha, where he became a successful sugarcane plantation owner. He settled in Waiawa, between Mana and Kekaha, immediately across the channel from Niʻihau Island. His son, Eric Alfred Knudsen, was born in Waiawa.

Knudsen was appointed land administrator by King Kamehameha for an area covering 400 km2, and was given the title konohiki as well as a position as a nobility under the king. Knudsen, who spoke fluent Hawaiian, later became an elected representative and an influential politician on the island.

Knudsen lends his name to the Knudsen Gap, a narrow pass between Hã’upu Ridge and the Kahili Ridge. Its primary function was as a sugar farm planted by the Knudsen family.

Geography

Kauai's origins are volcanic, the island having been formed by the passage of the Pacific Plate over the Hawaii hotspot. At approximately five million years old, it is the oldest of the main islands. It consists of a large eroded shield volcano with a  diameter summit caldera and two flank calderas. Rejuvenation of the volcano 1.40–0.6 million years ago resulted in the eruption of lavas and cones over the eastern two-thirds of the island.

The high annual rainfall has eroded deep valleys in the central mountains, carving out canyons with many scenic waterfalls. On the west side of the island, Waimea town is at the mouth of the Waimea River, whose flow formed Waimea Canyon, one of the world's most scenic canyons, which is part of Waimea Canyon State Park. Kokeo Point lies on the island's south side. The Na Pali Coast is a center for recreation in a wild setting, including kayaking past the beaches and hiking on the trail along the coastal cliffs. The headlands Kamala Point, Kawelikoa Point, Kuahonu Point, and Molehu Point are on the southeast of the island, and Makaokahaʻi Point is at the south.

Climate

Kauai's climate is tropical, with generally humid and stable conditions year-round, although weather phenomena and infrequent storms have caused instances of extreme weather. Kauai's mountainous regions offer cooler temperatures and a pleasant contrast to the warm coastal areas. In the winter, temperatures have been known to drop down to the 30s and 40s at Kōkeʻe state park, which holds an unofficial record low of  recorded in February 1986 at Kanaloahuluhulu Meadow.

Precipitation in Kauai's mountainous regions averages  annually. Mt. Waialeale is often cited as the wettest spot on earth, although this has been disputed.

Not only does Kauai hold a record in average yearly precipitation, it also holds a record in hourly precipitation. During a storm on January 24–25, 1956, a rain gauge at Kauai's former Kilauea Sugar Plantation recorded a record  of precipitation in just 60 minutes.

Time zone
Hawaii Standard Time (UTC−10:00) is observed on Kauai year-round. When most states are on daylight saving time, for example, the time on Kauai is three hours behind the West Coast of the United States and six hours behind the East Coast.

River system

Waimea River 
Hanalei River 
Hanapēpē River 
Wainiha River 
Wailua River 
Makaweli River 
Huleia River 
Kalihiwai River 
Anahola River 
Lumahaʻi River 
Kōʻula River 
Olokele River 
Kilauea Stream 
Waikomo Stream

Waterfalls

Halii Falls
Hanakapiai Falls
Hinalele Falls
Kalihiwai Falls
Kilauea Falls
Manawaiopuna Falls
Opaekaa Falls
Waialae Falls
Wailua Falls
Waipoo Falls

Economy

Tourism is Kauai's largest industry. In 2007, 1,271,000 people visited Kauai. The two largest groups were from the continental United States (84% of all visitors) and Japan (3%). As of 2003, there were a total of approximately 27,000 jobs on Kauai, of which the largest sector was accommodation/food services (26%, 6,800 jobs), followed by government (15%) and retail (14.5%), with agriculture accounting for 2.9% (780 jobs) and educational services providing 0.7% (183 jobs). The various sectors that constitute the visitors' industry accounted for one third of Kauai's income. Employment is dominated by small businesses, with 87% of all non-farm businesses having fewer than 20 employees. As of 2003, Kauai's unemployment rate was 3.9%, compared to 3.0% for the entire state and 5.7% for the U.S. as a whole. Kauai's poverty rate was 10.5%, compared to the contiguous 48 states at 10.7%.

As of mid-2004, the median price of a single-family home was $528,000, a 40% increase over 2003. As of 2003, Kauai's percentage of home ownership, 48%, was significantly lower than the state's 64%, and vacation homes were a far larger part of the housing stock than the statewide percentage (Kauai 15%, state 5%). Housing prices decreased significantly in 2008. As of spring 2014, the median price had risen to about $400,000.

From the 1830s through the mid-20th century, sugarcane plantations were Kauai's most important industry. In 1835, the first sugarcane plantation was founded on Kauai, and for the next century the industry dominated Hawaii's economy. Most of that land is now used for ranching. Kauai's sole remaining sugarcane operation, the 118-year-old Gay & Robinson Plantation, plans to convert its operation to cultivating and processing sugarcane ethanol.

Kauai is home to the U.S. Navy's "Barking Sands" Pacific Missile Range Facility, on the sunny and dry western shore. WWVH, WWV and WWVB are operated by the US National Institute of Standards and Technology, broadcasting standard time and frequency information to the public.

Land in Kauaʻi is very fertile; farmers raise many varieties of fruit and other crops. Guava, coffee, sugarcane, mango, banana, papaya, avocado, star fruit, kava, noni and pineapple are all cultivated on the island.

Energy

Kauaʻi Island Utility Cooperative (KIUC) is a not-for-profit electric cooperative headquartered in Līhue, which provides electricity for the island. With 24,000 member-owners who elect a nine-member board of directors, it is the only electric cooperative in the state.

In the 1970s, Kauaʻi burned sugarcane waste to supply most of its electricity.

By 2008, transition of energy sources and growth in generating capacity had occurred, with most of Kauaʻi's electricity now produced by importing liquid petroleum. In 2006 and 2007, the inputs cost $69.3 million and $83 million, respectively. By 2011, 92% of KIUC's power came from diesel.

By early 2017, KIUC's fuel mix was 56% fossil fuels, 9% hydroelectric, 12% biomass and 23% solar. KIUC had successfully integrated large-scale solar into its grid so that, during daylight hours on most sunny days, 97% or more of its generation comes from renewable sources. KIUC offers $1,000 rebates to residential customers who have solar water heating systems installed on their homes by Energy Wise Participating Contractors.

In March 2017, KIUC opened a Tesla Energy 13 MW / 52 MWh battery next to the 12 MW Kapaia solar plant for 13.9¢/kWh. In December 2018, KIUC opened an AES Distributed Energy project for 20 MW solar with 20 MW / 100 MWh batteries priced at 11.1¢/kWh.

Towns and communities

Līhue, on the island's southeastern coast, is the seat of Kauai County and the island's second-largest town. Princeville, on the island's north side, was once the capital of Kauai.

Communities on Kauai range in population from the roughly 10,000 people in Kapaa to tiny hamlets. Below are the larger or more notable of those from the northernmost end of Hawaii Route 560 to the western terminus of Hawaii Route 50:

Kauai towns and villages by population

Transportation

Air

Located on the southeastern side of the island, Lihue Airport is the only commercial airport with commercial airline services on Kauai. It has direct routes to Honolulu, Kahului/Maui, Kona/Hawaii, the U.S. mainland, and Vancouver, Canada. Other general aviation airports on the island not offering commercial airline services are Port Allen Airport and Princeville Airport. The Pacific Missile Range Facility has a 6,006-foot runway that is closed to general aviation traffic but could be used during a declared emergency landing.

Highways
Several state highways serve Kauaʻi County:
Hawaii Route 50, also known as Kaumualiʻi Highway, is a thirty-three mile road that stretches from Hawaii Route 56 at the junction of Rice Street in Līhue to a point approximately 1/5 mile north of the northernmost entrance of the Pacific Missile Range Facility on the far western shore.
Hawaii Route 58 stretches  from Route 50 in Līhue to the junction of Wapaa Road with Hawaii 51 near Nawiliwili Harbor on Kauai.
Hawaii Route 56, also known as Kuhio Highway, runs  from Hawaii Route 50 at the junction of Rice Street in Līhue to the junction of Hawaii Route 560 in Princeville.
Hawaii Route 560 passes  from the junction of Route 56 in Princeville and dead ends at Keʻe Beach in Haʻena State Park.

Other major highways that link other parts of the Island to the main highways of Kauaʻi are:
Hawaii Route 550 spans  from Route 50 in Waimea to Kōkeʻe State Park.
Hawaii Route 540 goes  from Route 50 in Kalaheo to Route 50 in Eleʻele. The road is mainly an access to residential areas and Kauai Coffee. It also functions as a bypass between Kalaheo and ʻEleʻele.
Hawaii Route 530, also called Kōloa Road, stretches  from Route 50 between Kalaheo and Lawai to Route 520 in Koloa. The road is mainly an alternative to Route 520 for travel from the west side to Poʻipū.
Hawaii Route 520 runs  from the "Tunnel of Trees" at Route 50 to Poʻipū on the south shore.
Hawaii Route 580 spans  from Route 56 in Wailua to where the road is no longer serviced just south of the Wailua Reservoir.
Hawaii Route 581 passes  from Route 580 in the Wailua Homesteads to a roundabout just west of Kapaʻa Town.
Hawaii Route 583, also known as Maalo Road, stretches  from Route 56 just north of Līhue to dead-end at Wailua Falls Overlook in the interior.

Hawaii Scenic Byway

Mass transit
The Kauai Bus is the public transportation service of the County of Kauai.

Places of interest

Kauai is home to thousands of moa (feral chickens) who have few natural predators, as the mongoose was never introduced in Kauai as it has been on other Hawaiian islands. Kauai's chickens originated from the original Polynesian settlers, who brought them as a food source. They have since bred with European chickens that got free from farms and cockfighting breeders, sometimes escaping during hurricanes.

The Kauai Heritage Center of Hawaiian Culture and the Arts was founded in 1998. Its mission is to nurture appreciation and respect for Hawaiian culture. It offers classes in Hawaiian language, hula, lei and cordage making, the lunar calendar and chanting, and trips to cultural sites.

Kauaʻi is home to many shave ice shops, a tradition in the islands.

Alakai Wilderness Area
Allerton Garden
Camp Naue YMCA
Fern Grotto
Haʻena State Park
Hanalei Bay
Hoʻopiʻi Falls
Honopū Valley
Kōkeʻe State Park
Limahuli Garden and Preserve
Makaleha Mountains
Makauwahi Cave Reserve
McBryde Garden
Moir Gardens
Moloaa Bay
Na ʻĀina Kai Botanical Gardens
Nā Pali Coast State Park
ʻOpaekaʻa Falls
Paoʻa Point
Poipu Beach Park
Polihale State Park
Queen's Bath
Sleeping Giant (Nounou Mountain)
Spouting Horn
Wailua River
Waimea Canyon State Park

Panorama gallery

In films

Kauai has been featured in more than 70 Hollywood movies and TV shows, including the musical South Pacific and Disney's 2002 animated feature film Lilo & Stitch along with its franchise's three sequel films (2003's Stitch! The Movie, 2005's Lilo & Stitch 2: Stitch Has a Glitch, and 2006's Leroy & Stitch) and first television series (Lilo & Stitch: The Series). Scenes from South Pacific were filmed in the vicinity of Hanalei. Waimea Canyon was used in the filming of the 1993 film Jurassic Park and its 2015 sequel Jurassic World. Scenes from the 2016 comedy film Mike and Dave Need Wedding Dates were also filmed. Parts of the island were also used for the opening scenes of the Indiana Jones film Raiders of the Lost Ark. Other movies filmed here include Six Days Seven Nights, the 1976 King Kong and John Ford's 1963 film Donovan's Reef. Recent films include Tropic Thunder and a biopic of Bethany Hamilton, Soul Surfer. A scene in the opening credits of popular TV show M*A*S*H was filmed in Kauai (helicopter flying over mountain top). Some scenes from Mighty Joe Young, Just Go with It, George of the Jungle, and Pirates of the Caribbean: On Stranger Tides were also filmed in Kauai. A Perfect Getaway is set in Kauai.

Parts of the 2002 film Dragonfly were filmed there, although the people and the land were presented as South American.

Major acts of two Elvis Presley films, 1961's Blue Hawaii and 1966's Paradise, Hawaiian Style, were filmed on Kauai. Both have scenes shot at the Coco Palms resort. In 1992 Hurricane Iniki destroyed the Coco Palms and it was never rebuilt.

The Descendants, a film by Alexander Payne released in 2011 and starring George Clooney, has major parts shot in Kauai, where the main character and his cousins own ancestral lands they are considering selling. The film is based on the 2007 novel by the Hawaiian writer Kaui Hart Hemmings.

See also

Kauaʻi cave wolf spider 
Beaches of Kauaʻi 
National Register of Historic Places listings in Hawaii#Kauai 
Weli Point
:Category:Headlands of Kauai
:Category:People from Kauai County, Hawaii

Explanatory notes

References

Further reading

External links

Kauai Community and Visitor Information
Kauai Chamber of Commerce
Hawaii Scenic Byways

 
Islands of Hawaii
Kauai
Calderas of Hawaii
Volcanic islands
Extinct volcanoes
Pliocene shield volcanoes
Pleistocene shield volcanoes
Neogene Oceania
Cenozoic Hawaii